This list of United States Air Force aircraft designations (1919–1962) includes prototype, pre-production and operational type designations under the 1919 and 1924 United States Army Air Service aircraft designation systems, which were used by the United States Air Force and its predecessors until the introduction of the unified United States Tri-Service aircraft designation system in 1962.

For aircraft designations after 1962, see List of United States Tri-Service aircraft designations. For aircraft that did not receive formal designations—including those procured before 1919 when no designation system was in force, and later aircraft that did not receive designations for other reasons—see List of undesignated military aircraft of the United States.

Prior to 1919 

Prior to 1919, all aircraft flown by the Army Air Service were referred to by the designation given to them by their manufacturer. During this period, a variety of both domestic and foreign types were operated, with the latter being the primary front-line types during World War I.

Army Air Service designations (1919–1924) 

In September 1919, the Army Air Service decided that it needed an organized designation sequence, and adopted fifteen classifications, designated by Roman numerals. Several other unnumbered designations were added later. Each designation was assigned an abbreviation, and each design a number within that abbreviation. Variants were designated by alphabetically appending letters to the design number.

Type O: Foreign-Built Pursuit Aircraft 
 Fokker D.VII – Fokker
 Fokker D.VIII – Fokker

Type I: Pursuit, water-cooled 
 PW-1 – Engineering Division
 PW-2 – Loening
 PW-3 – Orenco
 PW-4 – Gallaudet
 PW-5 – Fokker
 PW-6 – Fokker
 PW-7 – Fokker
 PW-8 – Curtiss
 PW-9 – Boeing

Type II: Pursuit, night 
 PN-1 – Curtiss

Type III: Pursuit, air-cooled 
 PA-1 – Loening

Type IV: Pursuit, ground attack, 1922 
 PG-1 – Aeromarine

Type V: Two-seat pursuit 
 TP-1 – Engineering Division

Type VI: Ground attack, 1920–1922 
 GA-1 – Boeing
 GA-2 – Boeing

Type VII: Infantry liaison 
 IL-1 – Orenco

Type VIII: Night observation 
 NO-1 – Douglas (not built)
 NO-2 – Douglas (not built)

Type IX: Artillery observation 
 AO-1 – Atlantic

Type X: Corps observation 
 CO-1 – Engineering Division
 CO-2 – Engineering Division
 CO-3 – Engineering Division
 CO-4 – Atlantic
 CO-5 – Engineering Division
 CO-6 – Engineering Division
 CO-7 – Boeing
 CO-8 – Atlantic

Type XI: Day bombardment 
 DB-1 – Gallaudet

Type XII: Night bombardment, short range 
 NBS-1 – Martin
 NBS-2 – Lowe-Willard-Fowler
 NBS-3 – Elias
 NBS-4 – Curtiss

Type XIII: Night bombardment, long range 
 NBL-1 – Witteman-Lewis
 NBL-2 – Martin (not built)

Type XIV: Trainer, air-cooled 
 TA-1 – Elias
 TA-2 – Huff-Daland
 TA-3 – Dayton-Wright Aircraft
 TA-4 – Engineering Division
 TA-5 – Dayton-Wright Aircraft
 TA-6 – Huff-Daland

Type XV: Trainer, water-cooled 
 TW-1 – Engineering Division
 TW-2 – Cox-Klemin
 TW-3 – Dayton-Wright Aircraft
 TW-4 – Fokker
 TW-5 – Huff-Daland

Ambulance, 1919–1924 
 A-1 – Cox-Klemin
 A-2 – Fokker

Messenger 
 M-1 – Engineering Division/Sperry

Pursuit, special 
 PS-1 – Dayton-Wright

Racer 

 R-1 – Alfred V. Verville
 R-2 – Thomas-Morse
 R-3 – Verville-Sperry
 R-4 – Loening
 R-5 – Thomas-Morse
 R-6 – Curtiss
 R-7 – Engineering Division
 R-8 – Curtiss

Seaplane 
 S-1 – Loening

Transport 
 T-1 – Martin
 T-2 – Fokker
 T-3 – Lowe-Willard-Fowler

Lighter-than-air craft 
 AC-1 — designed for "long flights and cross-country work", this was a 169 foot long, 180,000 cubic foot buoyancy craft which had one of its earliest long flights in May 1923.
 RN-1 — designated "Zodiac", this was a semi-rigid dirigible, 262.5 feet long with a 360,000 cubic foot buoyancy volume.

Army Air Corps/Army Air Forces/Air Force designations (1924–1962)

Amphibian

OA: Observation Amphibian (1925–1948) 
 OA-1 – Loening
 OA-2 – Loening
 OA-3 Dolphin – Douglas (redesignated from C-21)
 OA-4 Dolphin – Douglas (redesignated from C-26)
 OA-5 – Douglas
 OA-6 – Consolidated (not built)
 OA-7 – Douglas
 OA-8 – Sikorsky
 OA-9 Goose – Grumman (redesignated A-9 in 1948)
 OA-10 Catalina – Consolidated (redesignated A-10 in 1948)
 OA-11 – Sikorsky
 OA-12 Duck – Grumman (redesignated A-12 in 1948)
 OA-13 Goose – Grumman
 OA-14 Widgeon – Grumman
 OA-15 Seabee – Republic
 OA-16 Albatross – Grumman (redesignated A-16 in 1948)

A: Amphibian (1948–1962) 
 A-9 Goose – Grumman (redesignated from OA-9)
 A-10 Catalina – Consolidated (redesignated from OA-10)
 A-12 Duck – Grumman (redesignated from OA-12)
 A-16 Albatross – Grumman (redesignated from OA-16)

Attack

A: Attack (1924–1948) 
 A-1 – skipped to avoid confusion with the Cox-Klemin XA-1
 A-2 – Douglas
 A-3 Falcon – Curtiss
 A-4 Falcon – Curtiss
 A-5 Falcon – Curtiss (not built)
 A-6 Falcon – Curtiss (not built)
 A-7 – Fokker-America
 A-8 – Curtiss
 A-9 – Lockheed
 A-10 Shrike – Curtiss
 A-11 – Consolidated
 A-12 Shrike – Curtiss
 A-13 – Northrop
 A-14 – Curtiss
 A-15 – Martin (not built)
 A-16 – Northrop
 A-17 Nomad – Northrop
 A-18 Shrike – Curtiss
 A-19 – Vultee
 A-20 Havoc – Douglas (redesignated B-20 in 1948)
 A-21 – Stearman
 A-22 – Martin
 A-23 Baltimore – Martin
 A-24 Banshee – Douglas (redesignated F-24 in 1948)
 A-25 Shrike – Curtiss
 A-26 Invader – Douglas (redesignated B-26 in 1948)
 A-27 – North American
 A-28 Hudson – Lockheed
 A-29 Hudson – Lockheed
 A-30 – Martin (designation issued for Lend-lease production)
 A-31 Vengeance – Vultee
 A-32 – Brewster
 A-33 – Douglas
 A-34 – Brewster (designation issued for Lend-lease production)
 A-35 Vengeance – Vultee
 A-36 – North American
 A-37 – Hughes (unofficial designation created for contract purposes)
 A-38 Grizzly – Beechcraft
 A-39 – Kaiser-Fleetwings (not built)
 A-40 – Curtiss (not built)
 A-41 – Vultee
 A-42 Mixmaster – Douglas (not built)
 A-43 Blackhawk – Curtiss-Wright (not built)
 A-44 – Convair (not built)
 A-45 – Martin (redesignated B-51 in 1948)

Bomber 

Until 1926, the Army Air Service had three sequences for bombers. Light bombers were indicated by the LB- prefix, medium bombers by the B- prefix, and heavy bombers by the HB- prefix. In 1926, the three-category system was scrapped and all bombers subsequently built were placed in the B- sequence.

LB: Light Bomber (1924–1926) 
 LB-1 – Huff-Daland (later Keystone)
 LB-2 – Atlantic/Fokker
 LB-3 – Keystone
 LB-4 – Martin (not built)
 LB-5 – Keystone
 LB-6 – Keystone
 LB-7 – Keystone
 LB-8 – Keystone
 LB-9 – Keystone
 LB-10 – Keystone (redesignated B-3 in 1930)
 LB-11 – Keystone
 LB-12 – Keystone
 LB-13 – Keystone (redesignated B-4 in 1930)
 LB-14 – Keystone (redesignated B-5 in 1930)

B: Medium Bomber (1924–1926) 
 B-1 – Huff-Daland
 B-2 Condor – Curtiss

HB: Heavy Bomber (1924–1926) 
 HB-1 – Huff-Daland
 HB-2 – Atlantic/Fokker (not built)
 HB-3 – Huff-Daland (not built)

B: Bomber (1926–1962) 

 B-1 – Huff-Daland/Keystone
 B-2 Condor – Curtiss
 B-3 – Keystone
 B-4 – Keystone
 B-5 – Keystone
 B-6 – Keystone
 B-7 – Douglas
 B-8 – Fokker
 B-9 – Boeing
 B-10 – Martin
 B-11 – Douglas
 B-12 – Martin
 B-13 – Martin (not built)
 B-14 – Martin
 B-15 – Boeing (redesignated from BLR-1)
 B-16 – Martin (not built)
 B-17 Flying Fortress – Boeing
 B-18 Bolo – Douglas
 B-19 – Douglas (redesignated from BLR-2)
 B-20 – Boeing (not built)
 B-21 – North American
 B-22 – Douglas (not built)
 B-23 Dragon – Douglas
 B-24 Liberator – Consolidated
 B-25 Mitchell – North American
 B-26 Marauder – Martin
 B-27 – Martin (not built)
 B-28 Dragon – North American
 B-29 Superfortress – Boeing
 B-29D Superfortress – Boeing (redesignated B-50 in 1945)
 B-30 – Lockheed (not built)
 B-31 – Douglas (not built)
 B-32 Dominator – Consolidated
 B-33 Super Marauder – Martin (not built)
 B-34 Lexington – Lockheed
 B-35 – Northrop
 B-36 Peacemaker – Convair
 B-36G Peacemaker – Convair (redesignated B-60)
 B-37 – Lockheed (redesignated from B-34B)
 B-38 Flying Fortress – Boeing
 B-39 Superfortress – Boeing
 B-40 Flying Fortress – Boeing
 B-41 Liberator – Consolidated
 B-42 Mixmaster – Douglas
 B-43 Jetmaster – Douglas
 B-44 Superfortress – Boeing
 B-45 Tornado – North American
 B-46 – Convair
 B-47 Stratojet – Boeing
 B-47C Stratojet – Boeing (redesignated B-56, not built)
 B-48 – Martin
 B-49 – Northrop conversion of XB-35 to jet power
 B-50 Superfortress – Boeing (redesignated from B-29D)
 B-50C Superfortress – Boeing (redesignated B-54, not built)
 B-51 – Martin (redesignated from A-45)
 B-52 Stratofortress – Boeing
 B-53 – Convair (not built)
 B-54 – Boeing (redesignated from B-50C)
 B-55 – Boeing (not built)
 B-56 – Boeing (redesignated from B-47C not built)
 B-57 Canberra – Martin
 B-57D Canberra – Martin
 B-57F Canberra – Martin/General Dynamics
 B-58 Hustler – Convair
 B-59 – Boeing (not built)
 B-60 – Convair (redesignated from B-36G)
 B-61 Matador – Martin
 B-62 Snark – Northrop
 B-63 RASCAL – Bell
 B-64 Navaho – North American
 B-65 Atlas – Convair
 B-66 Destroyer – Douglas
 B-67 Crossbow – Radioplane
 B-68 – Martin (not built)
 B-68 Titan – Martin (conflicting designation, assigned after the original B-68 was canceled)
 B-69 Neptune – Lockheed
 B-70 Valkyrie – North American
 B-71 Blackbird – Lockheed (not built)

Beginning with #69, the "M-" (missile) and "B-" (bomber) series diverged. The missiles designated M-69 to M-92, some of which are incorrectly labeled as "formerly designated B-xx" in some sources, never used a "B-" series designation.  Beginning with #70, another sequence diverged, the "RS-" (Reconnaissance/Strike) series, which was later changed to the "SR-" (Strategic Reconnaissance) series of the Tri-Service system.

Non-sequential 
Some bomber designations were assigned out of sequence.

 B-20 Havoc – Douglas (redesignated from A-20 in 1948 after original B-20 was canceled)
 B-26 Invader – Douglas (redesignated from A-26 in 1948 after original B-26 was retired)

BLR: Bomber, long range (1935–1936) 
A short-lived designation used from 1935–1936 to refer to three long-range bomber projects commissioned by the Army Air Corps. Most of the bombers were night bombers.

 BLR-1 – Boeing
 BLR-2 – Douglas
 BLR-3 – Sikorsky (not built)

Cargo

C: Cargo (1924–1962) 

 C-1 – Douglas
 C-2 – Fokker
 C-3 – Ford
 C-4 – Ford
 C-5 – Fokker
 C-6 – Sikorsky
 C-7 – Fokker
 C-8 – Fairchild
 C-9 – Ford
 C-10 Robin – Curtiss-Wright
 C-11 Fleetster – Consolidated
 C-12 Vega – Lockheed
 C-13 – skipped
 C-14 – Fokker
 C-15 – Fokker
 C-16 – Fokker
 C-17 Super Vega – Lockheed
 C-18 Monomail – Boeing
 C-19 Alpha – Northrop
 C-20 – Fokker
 C-21 Dolphin – Douglas (redesignated to OA-3)
 C-22 Fleetster – Consolidated
 C-23 Altair – Lockheed
 C-24 – Fairchild
 C-25 Altair – Lockheed
 C-26 Dolphin – Douglas (redesignated to OA-3)
 C-27 Airbus – Bellanca
 C-28 – Sikorsky
 C-29 Dolphin – Douglas
 C-30 Condor – Curtiss-Wright
 C-31 – Kreider-Reisner
 C-32 – Douglas
 C-33 – Douglas
 C-34 – Douglas
 C-35 – Lockheed
 C-36 Electra – Lockheed
 C-37 Electra – Lockheed
 C-38 – Douglas
 C-39 – Douglas
 C-40 Electra – Lockheed
 C-41 – Douglas
 C-41A – Douglas
 C-42 – Douglas
 C-43 Traveller – Beechcraft
 C-44 – Messerschmitt
 C-45 Expeditor – Beechcraft
 C-46 Commando – Curtiss-Wright
 C-47 Skytrain – Douglas
 C-47F Skytrain – Douglas (redesignated from C-129)
 AC-47 Spooky – Douglas
 C-48 Skytrain – Douglas
 C-49 Skytrain – Douglas
 C-50 Skytrain – Douglas
 C-51 Skytrain – Douglas
 C-52 Skytrain – Douglas
 C-53 Skytrooper – Douglas
 C-54 Skymaster – Douglas
 C-55 Commando – Curtiss-Wright
 C-56 Lodestar – Lockheed
 C-57 Lodestar – Lockheed
 C-58 Bolo – Douglas
 C-59 Lodestar – Lockheed
 C-60 Lodestar – Lockheed
 C-61 Forwarder – Fairchild
 C-62 – Waco
 C-63 Hudson – Lockheed
 C-64 Norseman – Noorduyn
 C-65 Skycar – Stout
 C-66 Lodestar – Lockheed
 C-67 Dragon – Douglas
 C-68 – Douglas
 C-69 Constellation – Lockheed
 C-70 Nightingale – Howard
 C-70B Nightingale – Howard
 C-71 Executive – Spartan
 C-72 – Waco
 C-73 – Boeing
 C-74 Globemaster – Douglas
 C-75 – Boeing
 C-76 Caravan – Curtiss-Wright
 C-77 – Cessna
 C-77B/C/D – Cessna
 C-78 Bobcat – Cessna
 C-79 – Junkers
 C-80 – Harlow
 C-81 Reliant – Stinson
 C-82 Packet – Fairchild
 C-83 Coupe – Piper
 C-83A – Piper (redesignated L-4C)
 C-83B – Piper
 C-84 – Douglas
 C-85 Orion – Lockheed
 C-86 Forwarder – Fairchild
 C-87 Liberator Express – Consolidated
 C-88 – Fairchild
 C-89 – Hamilton
 C-90 – Luscombe
 C-91 – Stinson
 C-92 – Akron-Funk
 C-93 Conestoga – Budd
 C-94 – Cessna
 C-95 Grasshopper – Taylorcraft
 C-96 – Fairchild
 C-97 Stratofreighter – Boeing
 KC-97 Stratofreighter – Boeing
 C-98 Clipper – Boeing
 C-99 – Convair
 C-100 Gamma – Northrop
 C-101 Vega – Lockheed
 C-102 Sportster – Rearwin
 C-103 – Grumman
 C-104 – Lockheed
 C-105 – Boeing
 C-106 Loadmaster – Cessna
 C-107 Skycar – Stout
 C-108 Flying Fortress – Boeing
 C-109 Liberator Express – Consolidated
 C-110 – Douglas
 C-111 Super Electra – Lockheed
 C-112 – Douglas
 C-113 Commando – Curtiss-Wright
 C-114 Skymaster – Douglas
 C-115 Skymaster – Douglas (not built)
 C-116 Skymaster – Douglas
 C-117 Super Skytrain – Douglas
 C-117D Super Skytrain – Douglas (redesignated from Navy R4D-8 in 1962)
 C-118 Liftmaster – Douglas
 C-119 Flying Boxcar – Fairchild
 AC-119 – Fairchild
 C-120 Packplane – Fairchild
 C-121 Constellation – Lockheed
 C-121F Constellation – Lockheed
 C-122 Avitruc – Chase
 C-123 Provider – Fairchild
 C-123A – Chase
 C-124 Globemaster II – Douglas
 C-125 Raider – Northrop
 C-126 – Cessna
 C-127 Beaver – de Havilland Canada (redesignated to L-20)
 C-127 – Douglas (conflicting designation, assigned after original C-127 was redesignated)
 C-128 Flying Boxcar – Fairchild (not built)
 C-129 Super Skytrain – Douglas (redesignated to C-47F)
 C-130 Hercules – Lockheed
 C-130J Super Hercules – Lockheed Martin
 AC-130 – Lockheed
 DC-130 Hercules – Lockheed
 EC-130 – Lockheed
 EC-130H Compass Call – Lockheed
 HC-130 – Lockheed
 KC-130 Hercules – Lockheed
 LC-130 Hercules – Lockheed
 MC-130 – Lockheed
 RC-130 Hercules – Lockheed
 WC-130 Hercules – Lockheed
 C-131 Samaritan – Convair
 C-132 – Douglas (not built)
 C-133 Cargomaster – Douglas
 C-134 – Stroukoff
 C-135 Stratolifter – Boeing
 KC-135 Stratotanker – Boeing
 C-136 – Fairchild
 C-137 Stratofreighter – Boeing (redesignated C-97J)
 C-137 Otter – de Havilland Canada (conflicting designation, assigned after the original C-137 was redesignated) (redesignated U-1)
 C-137 Stratoliner – Boeing (conflicting designation, assigned after the original C-137s were redesignated)
 C-138 – reserved for Fokker F27, but never assigned
 C-139 – reserved for Lockheed P2V Neptune, but never assigned
 C-140 Jetstar – Lockheed
 C-141 Starlifter – Lockheed
 C-142 – Vought
 C-143 – reserved for what would become the X-19, but never officially assigned and later reused in the Tri-Service system

This sequence was restarted at C-1 with the introduction of the Tri-Service system.  However, the original sequence was picked up at C-143 starting in 2005, leading to the US military maintaining two separate sequences for cargo aircraft.

Drone

Aerial Target

GL: Target Glider (1922–1935) 
 GL-1 – McCook Field
 GL-2 – McCook Field
 GL-3 – McCook Field (incorrectly known as "G-3")

A: Aerial Target (1940–1941) 
 A-1 – Fleetwings
 A-2 – Radioplane
 A-3 – Curtiss
 A-4 – Douglas
 A-5 – Boeing (not built)
 A-6 – Douglas (not built)
 A-7 Airacobra – Bell
 A-8 Cadet – Culver (redesignated PQ-8 in 1941)

PQ: Aerial Target, man carrying (1943–1948) 
 PQ-8 Cadet – Culver (redesignated from A-8, redesignated Q-8 in 1948)
 PQ-9 Cadet – Culver
 PQ-10 – Culver (not built)
 PQ-11 – Fletcher (not built)
 PQ-12 – Fleetwings
 PQ-13 – ERCO
 PQ-14 Cadet – Culver  (redesignated Q-14)
 PQ-15 – Culver

OQ: Aerial Target, model airplane (1942–1948) 

 OQ-1 – skipped
 OQ-2 – Radioplane
 OQ-3 – Radioplane
 OQ-4 – Brunswick-Balke-Collender
 OQ-5 – unknown contractor (not built)
 OQ-6 – Radioplane
 OQ-7 – Radioplane
 OQ-8 – skipped
 OQ-9 – skipped
 OQ-10 – skipped
 OQ-11 – Simmonds Aerocessories
 OQ-12 – Radioplane
 OQ-13 – Radioplane
 OQ-14 – Radioplane
 OQ-15 – USAAF
 OQ-16 – Frankfort (not built)
 OQ-17 – Radioplane
 OQ-18 – unknown contractor
 OQ-19 – Radioplane

BQ: Controllable Bomb (1942–1945) 
 BQ-1 – Fleetwings
 BQ-2 – Kaiser-Fleetwings
 BQ-3 – Fairchild
 BQ-4 – Interstate
 BQ-5 – Interstate (not built)
 BQ-6 – Interstate (not built)
 BQ-7 Flying Fortress – Boeing
 BQ-8 Liberator – Consolidated

CQ: Target Control (1942–1948) 
 CQ-1 – Fletcher
 CQ-2 – Stinson
 CQ-3 Expeditor – Beechcraft
 CQ-4 Flying Fortress – Boeing

Q: Drone (1948–1962) 
 Q-1 – Radioplane
 Q-2 Firebee – Ryan
 Q-3 – Radioplane (not built)
 Q-4 – Northrop
 Q-5 Kingfisher – Lockheed
 Q-6 – WADC
 Q-7 – skipped, request for redesignation of QB-17 not approved
 Q-8 Cadet – Culver (redesignated from PQ-8)
 Q-8 – request for redesignation of QF-80 not approved
 Q-9 – WADC
 Q-10 – Radioplane
 Q-11 – WADC (not built)
 Q-12 – Beechcraft
 Q-13 – skipped
 Q-14 Cadet – Culver (redesignated from PQ-14)

Experimental

S: Supersonic/Special Test (1946–1948) 
The USAF established a separate sequence for purpose-built research aircraft in 1946.  Originally designated with the "S" mission letter, the sequence switched to "X" in 1948.

 S-1 – Bell (redesignated X-1 in 1948)
 S-2 – Bell (redesignated X-2 in 1948)
 S-3 Stiletto – Douglas (redesignated X-3 in 1948)
 S-4 Bantam – Northrop (redesignated X-4 in 1948)
 S-5 – Bell (redesignated X-5 in 1948)

X: Experimental (1948–1962) 

Below is a list of "X-planes" designated before 1962.  For a list of X-planes designated after 1962, see #X: Special research.

 X-1 – Bell (redesignated from S-1)
 X-2 – Bell (redesignated from S-2)
 X-3 Stiletto – Douglas (redesignated from S-3)
 X-4 Bantam – Northrop (redesignated from S-4)
 X-5 – Bell (redesignated from S-5)
 X-6 – Convair (not built)
 X-7 – Lockheed
 X-8 – Aerojet
 X-9 Shrike – Bell
 X-10 – North American
 X-11 – Convair
 X-12 – Convair
 X-13 Vertijet – Ryan
 X-14 – Bell
 X-15 – North American
 X-16 – Bell (not built)
 X-17 – Lockheed
 X-18 – Hiller
 X-19 – Curtiss-Wright
 X-20 Dyna-Soar – Boeing (not built)

Fighter

P: Pursuit (1924-1948) 

Designated P- for "pursuit" until June 1948, nine months after the United States Air Force was founded. After this, all P- designations were changed to F- ("fighter"), but the original numbers were retained.

 P-1 Hawk – Curtiss
 P-2 Hawk – Curtiss
 P-3 Hawk – Curtiss
 P-4 Hawk – Curtiss
 P-4 – Boeing (conflicting designation)
 P-5 Hawk – Curtiss
 P-6 Hawk – Curtiss
 P-7 – Boeing
 P-8 – Boeing
 P-9 – Boeing
 P-10 – Curtiss
 P-11 Hawk – Curtiss
 P-12 – Boeing
 P-13 Viper – Thomas-Morse
 P-14 – Curtiss (not built)
 P-15 – Boeing
 P-16 – Berliner-Joyce (redesignated PB-1)
 P-17 Hawk – Curtiss
 P-18 – Curtiss (not built)
 P-19 – Curtiss (not built)
 P-20 – Curtiss
 P-21 – Curtiss
 P-22 Hawk – Curtiss
 P-23 Hawk – Curtiss
 P-24 – Lockheed
 P-25 – Consolidated
 P-26 Peashooter – Boeing
 P-27 – Consolidated (not built)
 P-28 – Consolidated (not built)
 P-29 – Boeing
 P-30 – Consolidated (redesignated PB-2)
 P-31 Swift – Curtiss
 P-32 – Boeing
 P-33 – Consolidated (not built)
 P-34 – Wedell-Williams (not built)
 P-35 – Seversky
 P-36 Hawk – Curtiss
 P-37 – Curtiss
 P-38 Lightning – Lockheed
 P-39 Airacobra – Bell
 P-39E Airacobra – Bell
 P-40 Warhawk – Curtiss
 P-41 – Seversky
 P-42 – Curtiss
 P-43 Lancer – Republic
 P-44 Rocket – Republic (not built)
 P-45 – Bell (redesignated P-39C)
 P-46 – Curtiss
 P-47 Thunderbolt – Republic
 P-48 – Douglas (not built)
 P-49 – Lockheed
 P-50 – Grumman
 P-51 Mustang – North American
P-52 – Bell (not built)
 P-53 – Curtiss (not built)
 P-54 Swoose Goose – Vultee
 P-55 Ascender – Curtiss
 P-56 Black Bullet – Northrop
 P-57 Peashooter – Tucker (not built)
 P-58 Chain Lightning – Lockheed
 P-59 – Bell (not built)
 P-59 Airacomet – Bell (conflicting designation, assigned after the original P-59 was canceled)
 P-60 – Curtiss
 P-61 Black Widow – Northrop
 P-62 – Curtiss
 P-63 Kingcobra – Bell
 P-64 – North American
 P-65 – Grumman (not built)
 P-66 Vanguard – Vultee
 P-67 Bat – McDonnell
 P-68 Tornado – Vultee (not built)
 P-69 – Republic (not built)
 P-70 Nighthawk – Douglas
 P-71 – Curtiss (not built)
 P-72 – Republic
 P-73 – Hughes (unofficial designation created for contract purposes)
 P-74 – skipped
 P-75 Eagle – Fisher
 P-76 – Bell
 P-77 – Bell
 P-78 – North American (redesignated P-51B)
 P-79 – Northrop
 P-80 Shooting Star – Lockheed
 P-81 – Convair
 P-82 Twin Mustang – North American
 P-83 – Bell
 P-84 Thunderjet – Republic
 P-85 Goblin – McDonnell
 P-86 Sabre – North American
 P-87 Blackhawk – Curtiss
 P-88 Voodoo – McDonnell
 P-89 Scorpion – Northrop
 P-90 – Lockheed
 P-91 Thunderceptor – Republic
 P-92 – Convair

Non-sequential 
 P-322 Lightning – Lockheed (designation of rejected Royal Air Force Lightning Mk Is in USAAF service)
 P-400 Airacobra – Bell (designation of former RAF Airacobra Mk Is in USAAF service)

F: Fighter (1948–1962) 
 F-38 Lightning – Lockheed (redesignated from P-38)
 F-39 Airacobra – Bell (redesignated from P-39)
 F-40 Warhawk – Curtiss (redesignated from P-40)
 F-47 Thunderbolt – Republic (redesignated from P-47)
 F-51 Mustang – North American (redesignated from P-51)
 F-61 Black Widow – Northrop (redesignated from P-61)
 RF-61C Reporter – Northrop (redesignated from F-15)
 F-63 Kingcobra – Bell (redesignated from P-63)
 F-80 Shooting Star – Lockheed (redesignated from P-80)
 F-81 – Convair (redesignated from P-81)
 F-82 Twin Mustang – North American (redesignated from P-82)
 F-83 – Bell (redesignated from P-83)
 F-84 Thunderjet – Republic (redesignated from P-84)
 F-84F Thunderstreak – Republic (redesignated from F-96)
 F-84H Thunderscreech – Republic
 F-85 Goblin – McDonnell (redesignated from P-85)
 F-86 Sabre – North American (redesignated from P-86)
 F-86C Sabre – North American (redesignated F-93)
 F-86D/G/K/L Sabre – North American (redesignated from F-95)
 F-87 Blackhawk – Curtiss (redesignated from P-87)
 F-88 Voodoo – McDonnell (redesignated from P-88)
 F-89 Scorpion – Northrop (redesignated from P-89)
 F-90 – Lockheed (redesignated from P-90)
 F-91 Thunderceptor – Republic (redesignated from P-91)
 F-92 – Convair (redesignated from P-92)
 F-93 – North American (redesignated from F-86C)
 F-94 Starfire – Lockheed
 F-95 – North American (redesignated F-86D)
 F-96 – Republic (redesignated F-84F)
 F-97 Starfire – Lockheed (redesignated F-94C)
 F-98 Falcon – Hughes
 F-99 BOMARC – Boeing
 F-100 Super Sabre – North American
 F-100B Super Sabre – North American (redesignated F-107)
 F-101 Voodoo – McDonnell
 F-102 Delta Dagger – Convair
 F-102B Delta Dagger – Convair (redesignated F-106)
 F-103 – Republic
 F-104 Starfighter – Lockheed
 XF-104 Starfighter – Lockheed
 NF-104A Starfighter – Lockheed
 F-105 Thunderchief – Republic
 F-106 Thunderscreech – Republic (redesignated F-84H)
 F-106 Delta Dart – Convair (conflicting designation, assigned after the original F-106 was redesignated) (redesignated from F-102B)
 F-107 – North American (redesignated from F-100B)
 F-108 Rapier – North American (not built)
 F-109 – designation was reserved for the F-101B and Bell D-188A, but never officially assigned
 F-110 Spectre – McDonnell Douglas (redesignated F-4 in 1962)
 F-111 Aardvark – General Dynamics
 F-111B Aardvark – General Dynamics/Grumman
 EF-111A Raven – General Dynamics/Grumman
 AFTI/F-111A Aardvark – General Dynamics/Boeing
 Unofficial designations YF-112 and up were later assigned to black projects.

Non-sequential 
 F-24 Banshee – Douglas (redesignated from A-24 in 1948)

FM: Fighter, Multiplace 
 FM-1 Airacuda – Bell
 FM-2 – Lockheed (redesignated from PB-3, not built)

PB: Pursuit, Biplace 
 PB-1 – Berliner-Joyce (redesignated from P-16)
 PB-2 – Consolidated (redesignated from P-30)
 PB-3 – Lockheed (redesignated FM-2, not built)

Glider

AG: Assault Glider (1942–1944) 
 AG-1 – Christopher (not built)
 AG-2 – Timm (not built)

BG: Bomb Glider (1942–1944) 
 BG-1 – Fletcher
 BG-2 – Fletcher (not built)
 BG-3 – Cornelius (not built)

CG: Cargo Glider (1941–1948) 

 CG-1 – Frankfort (not built)
 CG-2 – Frankfort (not built)
 CG-3 – Waco
 CG-4 Hadrian – Waco
 CG-5 – St. Louis
 CG-6 – St. Louis (not built)
 CG-7 – Bowlus
 CG-8 – Bowlus
 CG-9 – AGA Aviation
 CG-10 Trojan Horse – Laister-Kauffman
 CG-11 – Snead (not built)
 CG-12 – Read-York
 CG-13 – Waco
 CG-14 – Chase
 CG-15 Hadrian – Waco
 CG-16 – General Airborne Transport
 CG-17 – Douglas
 CG-18 – Chase
 CG-19 – Douglas (not built)
 CG-20 – Chase

FG: Fuel Glider (1930–1948) 
 FG-1 – Cornelius

PG: Powered Glider (1943–1948) 
 PG-1 – Northwestern
 PG-2 – Ridgefield (redesignated G-2 in 1948)
 PG-3 – Waco (redesignated G-3 in 1948)

TG: Training Glider (1941–1948) 

 TG-1 – Frankfort
 TG-2 – Schweizer
 TG-3 – Schweizer
 TG-4 – Laister-Kauffman
 TG-5 Grasshopper – Aeronca
 TG-6 Grasshopper – Taylorcraft
 TG-7 Orlik – Warsztaty Szybowcowe
 TG-8 Grasshopper – Piper
 TG-9 – Sailplane Corporation of America
 TG-10 – Wichita Engineering (not built)
 TG-11 – Schempp-Hirth
 TG-12 – Bowlus (not built)
 TG-13 – Sailplane Corporation of America
 TG-14 – Stiglmeier
 TG-15 – Franklin
 TG-16 – Schultz
 TG-17 – Franklin
 TG-18 – Midwest Sailplane
 TG-19 – DFS
 TG-20 – Schempp-Hirth
 TG-21 – Notre Dame
 TG-22 – Mehlhose
 TG-23 – Harper-Corcoran
 TG-24 – Schempp-Hirth
 TG-25 Plover – Wolcott
 TG-26 – Universal
 TG-27 – Schneider
 TG-28 Hawk Junior – Haller
 TG-29 – Volmer Jensen
 TG-30 Bluebird – Smith
 TG-31 – Aero Industries
 TG-32 – Pratt-Read
 TG-33 – Aeronca

G: Glider (1948–1955) 
In 1948, all the glider categories were unified into a single sequence.

 G-2 – Ridgefield (redesignated from PG-2)
 G-3 – Waco (redesignated from PG-3)
 G-4 Hadrian – Waco (redesignated from CG-4)
 G-10 Trojan Horse – Laister-Kauffman (redesignated from CG-10)
 G-13 – Waco (redesignated from CG-13)
 G-14 – Chase (redesignated from CG-14)
 G-15 Hadrian – Waco (redesignated from CG-15)
 G-18 – Chase (redesignated from CG-18)
 G-20 – Chase (redesignated from CG-20)

S: Sailplane (1960–1962) 
 S-1 – Schweizer
 S-2 – Schweizer

Liaison

L: Liaison (1942–1962) 
 L-1 Vigilant – Stinson (redesignated from O-49 in 1942)
 L-2 Grasshopper – Taylorcraft (redesignated from O-57 in 1942)
 L-3 Grasshopper – Aeronca (redesignated from O-58 in 1942)
 L-4 Grasshopper – Piper (redesignated from O-59 and C-83A in 1942)
 L-4F/G Grasshopper – Piper (redesignated from C-83 in 1942)
 L-5 Sentinel – Stinson (redesignated from O-62 in 1942)
 L-6 Grasshopper – Interstate (redesignated from O-63 in 1942)
 L-7 – Universal
 L-8 Cadet – Interstate
 L-9 – Stinson (redesignated from AT-19 in 1942)
 L-10 – Ryan
 L-11 – Bellanca
 L-12 Reliant – Stinson
 L-13 – Stinson/Convair
 L-14 Cub – Piper
 L-15 Scout – Boeing
 L-16 Champion – Aeronca
 L-17 Navion – North American/Ryan
 L-18 Super Cub – Piper
 L-19 Bird Dog – Cessna (redesignated O-1 in 1962)
 L-20 Beaver – de Havilland Canada
 L-21 Super Cub – Piper
 L-22 Navion – Ryan
 L-23 Seminole – Beechcraft
 L-24 Courier – Helio
 L-25 – McDonnell (redesignated to H-35)
 L-26 Commander – Aero Design
 L-27 – Cessna
 L-28 Super Courier – Helio

Observation

O: Observation (1924–1942) 
 O-1 Falcon – Curtiss
 O-2 – Douglas
 O-3 Mohawk – Dayton-Wright
 O-4 – Martin (not built)
 O-5 – Douglas
 O-6 – Thomas-Morse
 O-7 – Douglas
 O-8 – Douglas
 O-9 – Douglas
 O-10 – Loening
 O-11 Falcon – Curtiss
 O-12 Falcon – Curtiss
 O-13 Falcon – Curtiss
 O-14 – Douglas
 O-15 – Keystone
 O-16 Falcon – Curtiss
 O-17 Courier – Consolidated
 O-18 Falcon – Curtiss
 O-19 – Thomas-Morse
 O-20 – Thomas-Morse
 O-21 – Thomas-Morse
 O-22 – Douglas
 O-23 – Thomas-Morse
 O-24 – Curtiss (not built)
 O-25 – Douglas
 O-26 – Curtiss
 O-27 – Fokker
 O-28 Corsair – Vought
 O-29 – Douglas
 O-30 – Curtiss (not built)
 O-31 – Douglas
 O-32 – Douglas
 O-33 – Thomas-Morse
 O-34 – Douglas
 O-35 – Douglas
 O-36 – Douglas
 O-37 – Keystone (not built)
 O-38 – Douglas
 O-39 Falcon – Curtiss
 O-40 Raven – Curtiss
 O-41 – Thomas-Morse
 O-42 – Thomas-Morse
 O-43 – Douglas
 O-44 – Douglas
 O-45 – Martin (not built)
 O-46 – Douglas
 O-47 – North American
 O-48 – Douglas (not built)
 O-49 Vigilant – Stinson
 O-50 – Bellanca
 O-51 Dragonfly – Ryan
 O-52 Owl – Curtiss
 O-53 Havoc – Douglas (not built)
 O-54 – Stinson
 O-55 – ERCO
 O-56 Ventura – Lockheed
 O-57 Grasshopper – Taylorcraft
 O-58 Grasshopper – Aeronca
 O-59 Grasshopper – Piper
 O-60 – Kellett
 O-61 – Pitcairn
 O-62 Sentinel – Stinson
 O-63 Grasshopper – Interstate

Reconnaissance

F: Photographic Reconnaissance (1930–1948) 
 F-1 – Fairchild
 F-2 Expeditor – Beechcraft
 F-3 Havoc – Douglas
 F-4 Lightning – Lockheed
 F-5 Lightning – Lockheed
 F-6 Mustang – North American
 F-7 Liberator – Consolidated
 F-8 Mosquito – de Havilland
 F-9 Flying Fortress – Boeing
 F-10 Mitchell – North American
 F-11 – Hughes
 F-12 Rainbow – Republic
 F-13 Superfortress – Boeing
 F-14 Shooting Star – Lockheed
 F-15 Reporter – Northrop

R: Reconnaissance (1948–1962) 
 R-11 – Hughes (redesignated from F-11)
 R-12 Rainbow – Republic (redesignated from F-12)
 R-16 Stratofortress – Boeing

RS: Reconnaissance/Strike (1960–1962) 
Both of the following aircraft are numbered in the B- (bomber) sequence.
 RS-70 Valkyrie – North American (not built)
 RS-71 Blackbird – Lockheed

Rotorcraft

G: Gyroplane (1935–1939) 
 G-1 – Kellett
 G-2 – Pitcairn

R: Rotary wing (1941–1948) 
In 1941, the category letter R- was allotted for "rotary wing" aircraft, and this designation was used until the founding of the United States Air Force in 1947, at which point the category letter was changed to H-, for "helicopter". However, the original numbering sequence was retained.

 R-1 – Platt-LePage
 R-2 – Kellett
 R-3 – Kellett
 R-4 Hoverfly – Sikorsky
 R-5 Dragonfly – Sikorsky
 R-6 Hoverfly II – Sikorsky
 R-7 – Sikorsky (not built)
 R-8 – Kellett
 R-9 – Firestone
 R-10 – Kellett
 R-11 – Rotorcraft
 R-12 – Bell
 R-13 Sioux – Bell
 R-14 – Firestone (not built)
 R-15 – Bell
 R-16 – Piasecki

H: Helicopter (1948–1962) 
 H-5 Dragonfly – Sikorsky (redesignated from R-5)
 H-6 Hoverfly II – Sikorsky (redesignated from R-6)
 H-9 – Firestone (redesignated from R-9)
 H-10 – Kellett (redesignated from R-10)
 H-11 – Rotorcraft (redesignated from R-11)
 H-12 – Bell (redesignated from R-12)
 H-13 Sioux – Bell (redesignated from R-13)
 H-14 – Firestone (redesignated from R-14, not built)
 H-15 – Bell (redesignated from R-15)
 H-16 – Piasecki (redesignated from R-16)
 H-17 – Hughes/Kellett
 H-18 – Sikorsky
 H-19 Chickasaw – Sikorsky
 H-20 Little Henry – McDonnell
 H-21 Workhorse/Shawnee – Piasecki
 H-22 – Kaman
 H-23 Raven – Hiller
 H-24 – Seibel
 H-25 Army Mule – Piasecki
 H-26 Jet Jeep – American Helicopter
 H-27 Transporter – Piasecki (redesignated from H-16A)
 H-28 – Hughes (not built)
 H-29 – McDonnell (not built)
 H-30 – McCulloch
 H-31 – Doman
 H-32 Hornet – Hiller
 H-33 – Bell
 H-34 Choctaw – Sikorsky
 H-35 – McDonnell (redesignated from L-25)
 H-36 – reserved for secret project LONG EARS
 H-37 Mojave – Sikorsky
 H-38 – reserved for secret project SHORT TAIL
 H-39 – Sikorsky
 H-40 – Bell
 H-41 Seneca – Cessna
 H-42 – Hughes
 H-43 Huskie – Kaman
 H-44 – reserved for secret project BIG TOM
 H-45 – reserved for secret project STEP CHILD

Trainer

AT: Advanced Trainer (1925–1948) 
 AT-1 – Huff-Daland
 AT-2 – Huff-Daland
 AT-3 – Boeing
 AT-4 Hawk – Curtiss
 AT-5 Hawk – Curtiss
 AT-6 Texan – North American
 AT-7 Navigator – Beechcraft
 AT-8 Bobcat – Cessna
 AT-9 Jeep – Curtiss-Wright
 AT-10 Wichita – Beechcraft
 AT-11 Kansan – Beechcraft
 AT-12 Guardsman – Republic
 AT-13 Gunner – Fairchild
 AT-14 Gunner – Fairchild
 AT-15 Crewmaker – Boeing
 AT-16 – Noorduyn
 AT-17 Bobcat – Cessna
 AT-18 Hudson – Lockheed
 AT-19 Reliant – Stinson
 AT-20 Anson – Federal
 AT-21 Gunner – Fairchild
 AT-22 Liberator – Consolidated
 AT-23 Marauder – Martin
 AT-24 Mitchell – North American

BC: Basic Combat (1936–1940) 
 BC-1 – North American
 BC-2 – North American
 BC-3 – Vultee

BT: Basic Trainer (1930–1948) 
 BT-1 – Douglas
 BT-2 – Douglas
 BT-3 – Stearman
 BT-4 – Curtiss
 BT-5 – Stearman
 BT-6 – Consolidated
 BT-7 – Consolidated
 BT-8 – Seversky
 BT-9 – North American
 BT-10 – North American
 BT-11 – Aircraft Research (not built)
 BT-12 – Fleetwings
 BT-13 Valiant – Vultee
 BT-14 – North American
 BT-15 Valiant – Vultee
 BT-16 Valiant – Vultee
 BT-17 – Boeing-Stearman

PT: Primary Trainer (1925–1948) 
 PT-1 Trusty – Consolidated
 PT-2 Trusty – Consolidated
 PT-3 Trusty – Consolidated
 PT-4 Trusty – Consolidated (not built)
 PT-5 Trusty – Consolidated
 PT-6 – Consolidated
 PT-7 Pinto – Mohawk
 PT-8 – Consolidated
 PT-9 – Stearman
 PT-10 – Verville
 PT-11 – Consolidated
 PT-12 – Consolidated
 PT-13 Kaydet – Boeing-Stearman
 PT-14 – Waco
 PT-15 – St. Louis
 PT-16 – Ryan
 PT-17 Kaydet – Boeing-Stearman
 PT-18 Kaydet – Boeing-Stearman
 PT-19 Cornell – Fairchild
 PT-20 – Ryan
 PT-21 Recruit – Ryan
 PT-22 Recruit – Ryan
 PT-23 Cornell – Fairchild
 PT-24 Tiger Moth – de Havilland
 PT-25 – Ryan
 PT-26 Cornell – Fairchild
 PT-27 Kaydet – Boeing-Stearman

T: Trainer (1948–1962) 
In 1948, the Advanced, Basic, and Primary Trainer categories were unified into one sequence.  Below are the designations that were assigned before the introduction of the Tri-Service system.  For the designations in the same sequence that were assigned after 1962, see #Continued original sequence (1962–present).

 T-6 Texan – North American (redesignated from AT-6)
 T-7 Navigator – Beechcraft (redesignated from AT-7)
 T-11 Kansan – Beechcraft (redesignated from AT-11)
 T-13 Valiant – Vultee (redesignated from BT-13)
 T-13 Kaydet – Boeing-Stearman (conflicting designation, redesignated from PT-13)
 T-17 Kaydet – Boeing-Stearman (redesignated from PT-17)
 T-19 Cornell – Fairchild (redesignated from PT-19)
 T-28 Trojan – North American
 T-29 Samaritan – Convair
 T-30 – Douglas (not built)
 T-31 – Fairchild (not built)
 T-32 Samaritan – Convair (not built)
 T-33 Shooting Star – Lockheed
 T-34 Mentor – Beechcraft
 T-35 Buckaroo – Temco
 T-36 – Beechcraft
 T-37 Tweet – Cessna
 T-38 Talon – Northrop
 T-39 Sabreliner – North American
 T-40 JetStar – Lockheed (not built)

See also

 List of U.S. DoD aircraft designations
 United States military aircraft serial numbers
 List of active United States military aircraft
 List of undesignated military aircraft of the United States
 List of United States Navy aircraft designations (pre-1962)
 List of United States Tri-Service aircraft designations
 United States military aircraft engine designations
 List of fighter aircraft
 List of maritime patrol aircraft
 List of airborne early warning aircraft
 List of tanker aircraft

References

Notes

Citations

Bibliography

External links
 OrBat United States of America – MilAvia Press.com: Military Aviation Publications
 U.S. Military Aircraft and Weapon Designations
 Designation-Systems.Net
 Joe Baugher Homepage
 Main Aircraft Page
 National Museum of the USAF – Home
 Brown-Shoe Navy:  U.S. Naval Aviation
 Uncommon Aircraft

United States Tri-Service, List of aircraft designations
Aircraft, Tri-Service